The Council on Tall Buildings and Urban Habitat (CTBUH) defines a residential building as one where 85 percent or more of its total floor area is dedicated to residential usage.

The tallest residential building in the world is Central Park Tower in Midtown Manhattan, New York City.

As of 2022, Dubai in the United Arab Emirates is home to five of the ten tallest residential buildings in the world. High-rise residential buildings are spread throughout the city, but most of them are concentrated in Dubai Marina, which is also known as the "tallest block in the world" because of the number of high-rise residential buildings.

History and ranking criteria
Since 2000, when CTBUH started maintaining a list of tallest residential buildings, The Belcher's Tower 1 and The Belcher's Tower 2 located in Hong Kong were the first tallest residential buildings whose heights equal  and were completed in 2000. 

In 2001, Trump World Tower in New York City became the tallest residential building in the world, until it was surpassed in 2003 by the 21st Century Tower followed by the Q1 on the Gold Coast in 2005. In 2012, Princess Tower in Dubai became the tallest residential building in the world, before being surpassed by 432 Park Avenue in New York City in 2014. The current tallest residential building, Central Park Tower, was topped out during September 2019 and completed in 2020.

The percentage of residential buildings whose height exceeds 200 metres increased from 34 percent in 2009 to 45 percent in 2010, making Burj Khalifa the world's first megatall building to include residential space.

The CTBUH insist that a building should only be added to the official tallest list when it is (i) topped out structurally and architecturally, (ii) fully clad, and (iii) open for business, or at least partially open. This became the CTBUH official definition of a building's "completion".

Tallest residential buildings
This includes spires and architectural details, but does not include antenna masts. An equal sign (=) following a rank indicates the same height between two or more buildings. The "Year" column indicates the year in which a building was completed.

Under construction

These buildings are under construction and are planned to rise at least .

On hold
This list contains residential buildings that are at least  in height and their construction is currently on hold.

Timeline of tallest residential buildings
This is a list of buildings that in the past held the title of tallest residential buildings in the world.

See also
List of tallest buildings in the world
List of tallest hotels in the world
List of cities with the most skyscrapers
List of tallest buildings in Asia
List of tallest residential buildings in Dubai

References
General

Specific

External links
 
 Diagram of skyscrapers on SkyscraperPage

Residential
Residential
Tallest